Nassar-Ud-Din, popularly known as Baba Naseeb-ud-Din Ghazi, was a Sufi teacher, follower of Suhrawardiyya order poet and writer born in Srinagar who traveled extensively. He is also called by the title of "Abul-Fuqra" (father of all faqirs) and he was the khalifa of renowned sufi saint Baba Dawood-i-Khaki.

Early life
He was from Rawalpendi and came with his father Mir Hassan Razi to Kashmir. At the age of 7 years he went to Sultan ul Arifeen Sheikh Hamza Makhdoom for attaining spiritual teachings and became his disciple, later Makhdoom handed over Baba Naseeb to Sheikh Baba Dawood Khaki.

Career
Baba Naseeb was an able Persian and Kashmiri writer. During preaching of Islam Baba Naseeb Ud Din Ghazi visited most in-accessible areas that time which include, Tibet, Iskardu, Karnah, Dardistan, Baltistan, Kishtwar, Doda, Baderwah, Poonch, Rajouri, Nowshera, Budgam, (Chewdara) etc. He constructed 1200 Mosques and Bathrooms, Musafir Khanas, Bridges and planted trees on both sides of the roads wherever he went to apprise people about the teaching Islam. By promoting the construction and playing role in missionary, He gained the title of "Ghazi". The title of "Naseeb" he had adopted for himself (sometimes he used Miskin, Nasib Kashmiri). There used to remain a large gathering of people there, that is why he was famous among the people with the patronymic filial of "Abul fuqara"-the father of faqirs.

Baba Naseeb Ud Din Ghazi and several disciples the famous among them are, Sheikh Momin, Haaj Baba, Baba Abdullah Guzaryali, Mohammed Amin Sofi, Mula Zehri Kashmiri, Khawaja Mohammed Amin Gazi, Mulla Tayub Tahiri, etc.

Books 
According to reports, Baba Naseeb Ud Din Ghazi has written about 22 books mostly in Arabic and Persian.  

 Noor Namah (Biography of Nund Rishi in Persian language).

 Reshi Namah.

Death 
Abul Fuqra left this world on 13 Muharram   1047 (AH) and was buried in the town of old Bijbehara, Kashmir. His annual Urs is being observed on 13th Muharram. His tomb is located in Baba Mohallah, which is structurally in square.

See also 
Abdul Qadir Gilani
Mir Sayyid Ali Hamadani
Hamza Makhdoom
Baba Haneef Ud Din Reshi

References 

Sufi shrines in India
Sufism in Jammu and Kashmir
Anantnag district
Kashmiri Muslims
Muslim saints